Stefano Baudino (born 28 December 1963) is an Italian former cyclist. He competed in the 1000m time trial event at the 1984 Summer Olympics.

Life and career

Baudino was born in the town of Pinerolo, Northwestern Italy to his father, Paulo Baudino. He joined the local cycling club at the age of eight, and was guided by his father as well as coach Claudio Godino. Baudino managed his first major achievement at the age of 17, when he competed at the 1981 UCI Junior Track World Championships in Leipzig, claiming bronze in the 1,000m.

The next year, Baudino went on to become the Italian National Champion in the 1,000m and replicated his success in 1983.
In the 1984 Summer Olympics, Baudino finished in ninth place in the 1km time trial.

References

External links
 

1963 births
Living people
Italian male cyclists
Olympic cyclists of Italy
Cyclists at the 1984 Summer Olympics
People from Pinerolo
Universiade medalists in cycling
Universiade silver medalists for Italy
Medalists at the 1983 Summer Universiade
Cyclists from Piedmont
Sportspeople from the Metropolitan City of Turin